"The Trance" is the forty-fifth episode and the tenth episode of the third season (1988–89) of the television series The Twilight Zone. In this episode, a phony medium appears to become possessed by the spirit he pretends to channel.

Plot
Con artists Leonard and Don have been having great success with a scam in which Leonard pretends to channel the spirit of Delos, a citizen of ancient Atlantis who lived to be 500 years old, and answers questions with his wisdom. They are moving on from doing profitable seminars to television appearances and book deals. As they discuss their upcoming schedule, Leonard unintentionally speaks in his Delos voice.

In a pre-interview for a television talk show, Leonard speaks in the voice again, saying all truth is subjective. Don and the producer are puzzled by Leonard's speaking as Delos without any pretense of going into a trance. Offended by their apparent lack of understanding, "Delos" snipes that the producer's boss is an adulteress and a drug user, prematurely ending the interview. Leonard has no memory of anything that happened during his time as Delos. Don has him go to a psychiatrist, but the psychiatrist thinks Leonard is just trying to buy credibility for his scam, and throws him out after Delos starts talking about the psychiatrist's dead wife. On the live television appearance, Leonard is again possessed. The spirit not only denies being Delos, but tells the audience that Delos does not exist, and says that his believers are all gullible sheep.

As a result, Leonard and Don's sponsors pull out and they are hit with a swarm of lawsuits. Don berates Leonard for not getting control of his alternate personality and severs their partnership. Leonard descends further into madness, now hearing the nameless spirit speak to him directly. As Leonard rages, the spirit tells him it will remain with him for the foreseeable future.

External links
 

1988 American television episodes
The Twilight Zone (1985 TV series season 3) episodes
Television episodes about spirit possession

fr:La Transe